Franz Joseph Lauth (18 February 1822, Landau, Germany – 11 February 1895, Munich), was a German Egyptologist.

Career
From 1842 to 1845 he studied classical philology. In 1849 he became a teacher at the Wilhelmsgymnasium (Munich). 
From 1863 to 1865 he traveled in Egypt (Part of the Ottoman Empire).
In 1865 he was appointed professor at the Maximilians Gymnasium and received the Great Golden Medal from Maximilian II of Bavaria, for his chronological studies of the zodiac circle of Dendera and Manetho.
From this recognition he was able to gain access to the collections at the court and library of king Ludwig I of Bavaria and study the royal collection of Egyptian artifacts held within. He later studied similar collections in Vienna, Trieste, Rome, Florence, Paris, London and Leiden (focusing especially on the papyri). He made major contributions to the newly founded Journal of Egyptian Language and Antiquities. In 1869 he was appointed Honorary Professor of Egyptology, at Munich University and curator of the Egyptian collections.
Some time later he began to be heavily criticized for the style of his writings. In the winter of 1872/73 he toured Egypt (Cairo, Alexandria and Luxor) which led to him publish some Travel letters, about his experiences there. Subsequent research by others increasingly diminished the importance of his writings. After his resignation in 1882, he was gradually forgotten.

He was elected as a member to the American Philosophical Society in 1872.

Selected works

Lauth published 184 books, papers and miscellaneous writings during his lifetime.
 From Prehistoric Times of Egypt: A clear representation of the Egyptian history and culture from first beginnings to Augustus (in 1879–80)
 The Zodiacs of Denderah: memo where they establish that these are memorial calendars of...
 Manetho and the Turiner King's papyrus (1865)
 The Historical Results of Egyptology (1869)
 Explicatory Index of the monuments of the Egyptian Alterthums (1875)
 Guide to the K. Antiquarium in Munich (1870)
Papyrus Prisse (82 pages)
 Egyptian Chronology (1877) - 240 pages
 From ancient Egypt: Issue 1 The prehistoric period  (544 pages)
 The Stele of Piankhy (1870)
 On the date of the Nativity - Letter to Mr.Bosanquet  (1876)

See also
Ancient Egyptian race controversy
Menes
Emil Schlagintweit
Johann Joachim Winckelmann

References

Further reading
Openlibrary In German. Retrieved 2011-09-13
 Selected works of Lauth Retrieved 13/09/2011
Google Books: Titles by Lauth (some with complete text available) Retrieved 13/09/2011

German Egyptologists
1822 births
1895 deaths
Philologists
History of Munich
German male non-fiction writers
People from Landau
Archaeologists from Rhineland-Palatinate